The following is a listing of pitching win and winning percentage records in Major League Baseball.  All teams are considered to be members of the American or National Leagues, unless noted.  Players denoted in boldface are still actively contributing to the record noted.  An (r) denotes a player's rookie season.

Career record for most wins

Top 10 career wins by league

100 wins in two leagues

45 wins, one season

30 wins, one season, since 1901

Nine or more seasons with 20 wins

Seven or more consecutive seasons with 20 wins

Thirteen or more seasons with 15 wins

Ten or more consecutive seasons with 15 wins

League leader in wins, 5 or more seasons

League leader in wins, 3 or more consecutive seasons

League leader in wins, two leagues

League leader in wins, three decades

League leader in wins, three different teams

0.650 win–loss percentage, career
see notes2 3

0.875 winning percentage, season
see note5

Notes
 Nichols' and Radbourn's streaks date from the start of their careers; the only pitchers to start their careers with streaks of seven consecutive seasons of 20 wins.
 Winning percentage is generally computed to the thousandths place.  When necessary, the percentage is computed to greater precision to establish a true order.
 Minimum of 200 decisions (wins + losses).
 Vic Rasci's record of 132–66 (0.667) does not meet the minimum number of decisions to qualify for this list; however, when he is credited with two additional losses, his percentage drops to 0.660, which still qualifies him for this listing.
 Minimum of 15 decisions.
 Sutcliffe started the 1984 season with a record 4–5 with the Cleveland Indians of the American League before being traded to the Cubs.

References

Wins
Wins